South Carolina Highway 122 (SC 122), also known as Dave Lyle Boulevard, is a  state highway in Rock Hill, York County, South Carolina. It travels from the intersection with West Main Street in Rock Hill and continues west to Waterford Park Drive, also in Rock Hill.

Route description

SC 122 starts at SC 72's eastern terminus on Johnston Street before exiting just north of the intersection onto Dave Lyle Boulevard.  From there, it follows Dave Lyle Boulevard northeasterly, intersecting Main Street and further down a full interchange with U.S. Route 21 (US 21)/SC 121. The highway continues on a more easterly course to an interchange with Interstate 77 (I-77) before terminating at Waterford Park Drive.

History

The first SC 122 appeared in 1941 or 1942 as a new primary  routing from SC 2 in Cayce to US 1/US 21/SC 2/SC 5 in West Columbia.  It was decommissioned in 1948.

The current SC 122 was established as a new primary routing in 1974 or 1975; it went from SC 72 east to I-77. In 2001, it was extended to its current eastern terminus at Waterford Park Drive.

Future
Future plans are to construct an extension of SC 122 east into Lancaster County, ending at the US 521/SC 75 intersection; which will connect the Catawba Reservation and provide another crossing over the Catawba River.

Major intersections

See also

References

External links

SC 122 at Virginia Highways' South Carolina Highways Annex

Rock Hill, South Carolina
Transportation in York County, South Carolina
122